Gene Sullivan may refer to:

Gene Sullivan (basketball) (1931–2002), American basketball coach and collegiate athletic director
Gene Sullivan (American football), American football coach
Gene Sullivan (footballer) (1903–1969), Australian rules footballer